David Jenkins (1582 – 6 December 1663) was a Welsh judge and Royalist during the English Civil War.

Jenkins was born at Pendeulwyn (English: Pendoylan), Glamorgan, son of a well-established gentry family. He was educated at St Edmund Hall, Oxford, admitted to Gray's Inn on 5 November 1602 and called to the bar in 1609. In March 1643 he was appointed, against his will, as puisne judge of the Carmarthen circuit of the court of great sessions. He was a strong supporter of the Royalist cause in the civil war and, later that year, was involved in raising money for the siege of Gloucester. He indicted several prominent parliamentarians for high treason. Jenkins was captured by the parliamentarians in December 1645 in Hereford after the surprise attack on the city and imprisoned in the Tower of London, Newgate Prison and latterly in Wallingford and Windsor Castles. Whilst in prison in the 1640s, Jenkins wrote a number of political tracts which were collectively published in 1648 as: The Works of the Eminent and Learned Judge Jenkins upon divers Statutes concerning the King's Prerogative and the Liberty of the Subject.

Jenkins was brought before parliament in April 1647, but argued that it had no power to try him in the absence of the king. His arguments were expounded in his scholarly work, Lex Terrae which cited important authorities. The nub of his case, against the legitimacy of parliament in appointing justices and passing laws, was that such acts could only be performed with the explicit authority of the king and that the claim that the king was 'virtually' present in proceedings of the two Houses of Parliament was false.

On 22 February 1648, Jenkins was brought to the House of Commons to face charges including the writing of treasonous pamphlets. He refused to kneel at the bar of the house and was fined £1000 for contempt. In 1650 Jenkins was amongst other prisoners that the Rump Parliament considered executing. He said that if he was to go to the scaffold he would be "hanged with the Bible under one arm and Magna Carta under the other".

Jenkins was eventually released in 1657 prior to the restoration of the monarchy. His estate at Hensol had been sequestered in 1652, but he regained it (estimated to be worth £1500 p.a.) and lived there, becoming patron of the bards. He died in 1663 and was buried at Cowbridge. The obituary for Jenkins is apparently the first of its kind in the English-speaking world, published in The Newes on 17 December 1663 by Charles II's Surveyor of the Press, Roger L'Estrange. Part of it read:

"... that Eminent, Loyall, and renowned Patriot, Judge Jenkins, Departed this Life at his House in Cowbridge, [at] 81..in perfect Sence and Memory. He dyed, as he lived, preaching with his last Breath to his Relations, and those who were about him, Loyalty to his Majesty, and Obedience to the Lawes of the Land. In fine, he has carried with him all the comforts of a Quiet Conscience, and left behind him an unspotted Fame..."

Mary Jenkins, daughter of Judge David Jenkins, was wife of Sir Robert Thomas, 2nd Baronet, married c. 1654.  Robert Thomas and his father, Sir Edward Thomas, were also Royalists during the Civil War.

References

 Brooks, Christopher W. Jenkins, David (1582-1663), royalist judge Oxford Dictionary of National Biography. (Online access limited to subscribers)

1582 births
1663 deaths
17th-century Welsh judges